Aleksandr Pavlov (ru)
 Valentin Padalka (ru)
 Gennady Padalka
 Sergey Palagin
 Aleksey Palatidi (ru)
 Aleksandr Pankov (ru)
 Andrey Panov (ru)
 Vladislav Panov (ru)
 Aleksandr Panfilov (ru)
 Anatoly Panfilov (ru)
 Ilya Panfilov (ru)
 Vadim Pankov (ru)
 Mikhail Pankov (ru)
 Dmitry Parfyonov (ru)
 Yevgeny Parchinsky (ru)
 Maksim Passar
 Nikolai Patrushev
 David Pashaev (ru)
 Valentin Pashin
 Vasilisa Pashchenko (ru)
 Aleksandr Pegishev (ru)
 Aleksandr Pelikh (ru)
 Sergey Pereslavtsev (ru)
 Sergey Perets
 Dmitry Perminov (ru)
 Aleksandr Perov (ru)
 Vasily Pershikov (ru)
 Pavel Petrachkov (ru)
 Igor Petrikov (ru)
 Aleksandr Petrov (ru)
 Vasily Petrov (ru)
 Dmitry Petrov (ru)
 Mikhail Petrov (ru)
 Oleg Petrov (ru)
 Sergey Petrov (ru)
 Vyacheslav Petrusha (ru)
 Sergey Petrushko (ru)
 Vadim Petukhov (ru)
 Aleksandr Pechnikov (ru)
 Oleg Peshkov
 Vladimir Pismennyy (ru)
 Dmitry Plotnikov (ru)
 Marina Plotnikova
 Sergey Podvalnyy (ru)
 Mikhail Pozdnyakov (ru)
 Aleksandr Poleshchuk
 Dmitry Polkovnikov (ru)
 Valery Polyakov
 Valentin Polyansky (ru)
 Aleksandr Ponomaryov (ru)
 Viktor Ponomaryov (ru)
 Aleksandr Popov (ru)
 Valery Popov (ru)
 Gennady Popov (ru)
 Leonid Popov (ru)
 Denis Portnyagin (ru)
 Vladislav Posadsky (ru)
 Aleksandr Postoyalko (ru)
 Valery Potashov (ru)
 Vitaly Potylintsyn (ru)
 Sergey Preminin
 Andrey Pribytkov (ru)
 Fyodor Prokopenko (ru)
 Sergey Prokopyev
 Vladimir Pronichev
 Dmitry Pronyagin (ru)
 Aleksandr Prokhorenko
 Oleg Protsenko (ru)
 Gennady Prusakov (ru)
 Aleksandr Puzinovsky (ru)
 Aleksey Putsykin (ru)
 Sergey Pyatnitskikh (ru)

References 
 

Heroes P